Goalball at the 2019 Parapan American Games were held in Villa Deportiva Regional del Callao Miguel Grau Coliseum, Lima from August 25–31, 2019. There were 2 gold medals in this sport.

Medal summary

Medal table

Medalists

See also
Goalball at the 2020 Summer Paralympics

References

External links
 Goalball

2019 Parapan American Games